Never Gonna Stop is an album of Christian worship music by Tommy Walker. The Contemporary Christian album was recorded live Christian Assembly in Los Angeles, California and was released in 2000 by Integrity, Hosanna! Music, and Word. Never Gonna Stop is Hosanna! Music's 100th album featuring Tommy Walker and world-class musicians such as Justo Almario, Bob Wilson, and Jerry Watts, this new release will draw you to your feet and make you hungry for worship. The album captures a new sound of worship and is the perfect recording to celebrate Hosanna! Music's 100th album!

Track listing
"How Good and Pleasant"
"Only A God Like You"
"He Saved Us To Show His Glory"
"Give Us The Sounds"
"Jesus, That Name"
"When All Is Said And Done"
"I Fix My Eyes On You"
"Lets Think About Our God"
"Where You Are"
"I Hide Myself In Thee"
"Jerry's Story"
"He Knows My Name"
"How Could I But Love You"
"Never Gonna Stop"

Credits
Producers:
 Tommy Walker
 Bob Wilson

Executive Producers:
 Don Moen
 Chris Thomason

A&R:
 Chris Springer

Worship Leader:
 Tommy Walker - Worship leader

Musicians:
 Bob Wilson - Drums
 Justo Almario - Flute, Saxophone, Percussion, Bass Clarinet
 Alberto Salas – Keyboards, Percussion
 Jerry Watts - Bass
 Tommy Walker – Guitar

Vocals:
 Linda McCrary
 Kristle Murden
 Jimmy "Z" Zavala
 Victor Perez
 Kristina Hamilton

Choir
 Dick Martin
 Bob Ross
 Steven Springer
 Jimmy "Z" Zavala
 Deborah Brown
 Sara Evans
 Kurt Knudson
 Laura Wood
 Susan Bauer Lee
 Alicia Correa
 Cathy Green
 Annette Lopez
 Andrea Rhodes
 Melanie Harrison
 Robert Wong
 Kim Wood
 Chris Brantley
 Norma Abad
 Sarah Hart
 Renee Porter
 Mike Bagasao
 Don Andrues
 David Artuso
 Suzy Avila
 Joy Bagasao
 Diana Bear
 Kent Butler
 Benjamin Chang
 Stephanie Chin
 Susan Christopher
 Tracy Clave
 Terri Cole
 Heather Colon
 Jean Cosby
 Tess Cox
 Shannon Denny
 Rosanna Carla DiLoreto
 LaDonna Macauley
 Natalie Dunbar
 Mindi Ferguson
 Hannah Ford
 Bernie Franklin
 Colleen Frawley
 Jennica Frickman
 Alyssa Gayle
 Patricia Geyling
 Paloma Gibson
 Christy Gonzalez Aden
 Gerry Gonzalez
 Brad Hamilton
 Michelle Harden
 April Brown
 Peter Day
 Andy Evans
 David Haynes

Engineers
 Mark Williams -  Monitor Engineer
 Paul Mills - Mixing
 Dan Garcia - Engineer

Tommy Walker (worship leader) albums
2000 live albums